Bulbophyllum algidum is a species of orchid in the genus Bulbophyllum discovered in former British New Guinea by the Wollaston Expedition of 1912–1913, led by Sandy Wollaston. The specimen was discovered at a high altitude, between 10,500 and 12,500 feet.

References

External links
The Internet Orchid Species Photo Encyclopedia
The Bulbophyllum-Checklist
Tropicos Database

algidum
Plants described in 1916